Alice Pirsu (born 16 May 1979) is a former professional tennis player from Romania.

Biography
Born in Bucharest, Pirsu competed on the professional tour in the 1990s. As a junior, she had a top ranking of 24 and reached the second round at Wimbledon.

Beginning on the ITF Circuit in 1994, she won her biggest title at Athens in 1997, defeating Evgenia Kulikovskaya in the final of a $25k tournament. She played five singles and five doubles rubbers for Romania's Fed Cup team across 1997 and 1998, in a total of seven ties. In 1998, her final year on tour, she reached her best singles ranking of 200 in the world.

Pirsu left the professional tennis circuit to attend the University of Pennsylvania. While studying for her economics degree she was a co-captain of the university's tennis team, the Penn Quakers, earning the Ivy League Player of the Year award in both 2002 and 2003. She made the final eight of the 2003 NCAA Division I Women's Tennis Championships, becoming the first Quakers player to have done so.

She is now based in New York and runs an interior design company in Pelham.

ITF finals

Singles (1–3)

Doubles (1–6)

References

External links
 
 
 

1979 births
Living people
Romanian female tennis players
Penn Quakers women's tennis players
Tennis players from Bucharest